Ziemblice  is a village in the administrative district of Gmina Staszów, within Staszów County, Świętokrzyskie Voivodeship, in south-central Poland.

The village has a population of  116.

Demography 
According to the 2002 Poland census, there were 132 people residing in Ziemblice village, of whom 52.3% were male and 47.7% were female. In the village, the population was spread out, with 21.2% under the age of 18, 28% from 18 to 44, 28% from 45 to 64, and 22.7% who were 65 years of age or older.
 Figure 1. Population pyramid of village in 2002 — by age group and sex

References

Ziemblice